Anthem is the second studio album by the alternative rock band Goodness. It was released in 1998 on Immortal Records.

Track listing
All songs by Goodness
Anthem - 3:42
Pretender - 3:31
Bitter Man - 3:40
I'd Rather - 3:59
Walkaway - 4:49
Night & Day - 3:20
Hiccup - 3:36
Turn the World Around - 4:07
Lost - 3:27
Our Last Goodbye - 5:35
Ashes - 4:24
Cozy - 5:14

Personnel
Carrie Akre - vocals
Garth Reeves - guitar, vocals
Chris Friel - drums
Fiia McGann - bass, vocals
Danny Newcomb - guitar

Additional personnel
Eric Akre - percussion
Chris Akre - vocals
Chris Xefos - keyboards
Carl Glanville - mixing, engineer
Ted Niceley - producer

References

External links
 Anthem at Allmusic
 Anthem at Discogs

1998 albums
Goodness (band) albums
Immortal Records albums
Albums produced by Ted Niceley